Plastics News is a weekly, 46,000-circulation trade newspaper delivering global news to a primarily North American market. Founded by Crain Communications Inc. in Akron, Ohio, in 1989, it covers the business of the global plastics industry. The publication relocated to Crain's corporate headquarters in Detroit in 2013.

Plastics News focuses on commercial, financial, legislative and market-related developments worldwide that affect North American plastic product manufacturers and their suppliers and customers. The publication launched a Web site in 1996.

Today it is part of the Crain Global Polymer Group. The group started to take shape after Crain’s purchase in July 2007 of the UK-based polymer publishing assets of Emap Communications Ltd. Plastics News and its sister publications together comprise the world's largest plastics publishing organization. Owned by the privately held Crain Communications Inc., these brands – which include Plastics News, Rubber News, Tire Business, Sustainable Plastics, and Urethanes Technology International encompass five print publications, websites, eNewsletters, multiple conferences and some industry award programs.

The U.S. publication launched its PlasticsNews.com website in 1996, and today that audited site attracts more than 80,000 unique visitors per month. The company launched its bilingual Plastics News China as a free e-mail newsletter in May 2005, along with a companion Plastics News China website. Both products are offered in English and simplified Chinese.

Plastics News organizes several events, including its annual Executive Forum and various business conferences in North America, covering such topics as automotive, medical devices, plastic caps and closures, workforce issues, sustainability, packaging and more. These serve as forums to present new products and ideas and for independent discussion of issues of concern to the industry.

Since 1996, PN has given its Processor of the Year Award to a North American plastics processor, and it honors the winner in a ceremony each year at the Executive Forum. Beginning in 2011, it also began to present three PN Excellence Awards to processors for excelling in customer relations, employee relations and industry/public service. Plastics News also started giving out Best Places to Work in Plastics awards in 2014.

Plastics News has more than 21,000 followers on Twitter, 5,200 on Facebook,  75,900 on LinkedIn,  and 3,100 on Instagram.

PN has won numerous journalism awards including from the American Society of Business Publication Editors for video reports and trade show dailies. The Detroit Society of Professional Journalists also honored PN with multiple awards.

References

PR Newswire
Crain Communications Inc

External links
 Official website

Business magazines published in the United States
Magazines established in 1989
Magazines published in Ohio
Magazines published in Detroit
Plastics industry organizations
Professional and trade magazines
Weekly magazines published in the United States